John N. Friedman is an economist who currently serves as Professor of Economics, Chair of Economics, and Professor of International and Public Affairs at Brown University. He additionally co-directs Opportunity Insights and is a Research Associate of the National Bureau of Economic Research.

Career 
Friedman earned an A.B., A.M. and Ph.D. from Harvard University.

His research interests include public economics and political economy. Friedman was previously an assistant professor of public policy at Harvard's Kennedy School of Government and served as a Special Assistant to President Obama for Economic Policy within the White House National Economic Council in 2013–2014. He became editor-in-chief of the Journal of Public Economics in 2019.

During the COVID-19 Pandemic, Friedman co-led a group that developed an economic tracker, the Opportunity Insights Economic Tracker. This presented private-sector data on economic trends more frequently and more rapidly than officially published economic statistics.

Personal life 
Friedman is married to Hilary Levy Friedman, a visiting assistant professor of education at Brown. The couple met in the fall of 2002 while they were completing fellowships at the University of Cambridge. They have two sons.

Selected works
 Chetty, Raj, John N. Friedman, Nathaniel Hilger, Emmanuel Saez, Diane Whitmore Schanzenbach, and Danny Yagan. "How does your kindergarten classroom affect your earnings? Evidence from Project STAR." The Quarterly journal of economics 126, no. 4 (2011): 1593–1660.
 Chetty, Raj, John N. Friedman, and Jonah E. Rockoff. "Measuring the impacts of teachers II: Teacher value-added and student outcomes in adulthood." American economic review 104, no. 9 (2014): 2633–79.
 Chetty, Raj, John N. Friedman, and Jonah E. Rockoff. "Measuring the impacts of teachers I: Evaluating bias in teacher value-added estimates." American Economic Review 104, no. 9 (2014): 2593–2632.
 Chetty, Raj, John N. Friedman, Tore Olsen, and Luigi Pistaferri. "Adjustment costs, firm responses, and micro vs. macro labor supply elasticities: Evidence from Danish tax records." The quarterly journal of economics 126, no. 2 (2011): 749–804.
 Chetty, Raj, John N. Friedman, Søren Leth-Petersen, Torben Heien Nielsen, and Tore Olsen. "Active vs. passive decisions and crowd-out in retirement savings accounts: Evidence from Denmark." The Quarterly Journal of Economics 129, no. 3 (2014): 1141–1219.

References

American economists
Brown University faculty
Harvard University alumni
Living people
Place of birth missing (living people)
Year of birth missing (living people)